French-Romanian relations are bilateral foreign relations between France and Romania. Diplomatic relations between the two countries date back to 1880, when mutual legations were opened, although contacts between France and Romania's precursor states stretch into the Middle Ages.

Both countries are full members of NATO and of the European Union. Since 1993, Romania is a member of the Francophonie.
France has given full support to Romania's membership in the European Union and NATO.

History 
The first contacts between the Romanians and the French started in the late 14th century, when the French knights led by John of Nevers participated in the Battle of Nicopolis alongside Voivode Mircea the Elder and his soldiers.

16th - 18th centuries
Between 1579 and 1583, King Henry III supported Petru Cercel in his bid for the Wallachian throne.

During the 17th and 18th centuries, the relations between the French and the Romanians intensified due to the numerous French merchants and intellectuals who traveled to the Romanian Principalities. In 1762,  proposed the establishment of a French representation in the Principalities. A French consulate would be opened in 1798 in Bucharest, and a vice consulate in Iași.

19th century
In 1860, the French Emperor Napoleon III send a French military mission to Romania.

20th century
French foreign policy in the 1920s and 1930s aimed to build military alliances with small nations in Eastern Europe in order to counter the threat of German attacks.  Paris saw Romania as an ideal partner in this venture, especially in  1926 to 1939. During World War II the alliance failed. Romania was first neutral and then after Germany defeated France in 1940 it aligned with Germany. The main device France had used was arms sales in order to strengthen Romania and ensure its goodwill. French military promises were vague and not trusted after the sellout of Czechoslovakia at Munich in 1938, By 1938 French needed all the arms it could produce. Meanwhile, Germany was better poised to build strong economic ties.  In 1938-39 France made a final effort to guarantee Romanian borders because it calculated that Germany needed Romanian oil, but Romania decided war with Germany would be hopeless and so it veered toward Berlin.

Companies 

In 1976-1994 the French automaker Citroën attempted to make  profit with a  socialist–capitalist joint venture.  It built the Citroën Axel for Western markets, while branding it the Oltcit in Romania.  Romania was seeking up-to-date technology to strengthen its weak industrial sector.  Citroën wanted peripheral production centres with lower wages to lower production costs and reach new markets. In the long run the venture was a costly failure for several reasons.  Supply lines were often interrupted so that production output fell short of expectations. Romanian factories were unable to produce flawless cars or meet delivery deadlines. 

The French multinational banking company Société Générale acquired the majority stake in the Romanian bank Banca Română pentru Dezvoltare in 1999, and renamed it BRD – Groupe Société Générale. It is the third largest bank in Romania by total assets and market share.

French construction company Colas Group has worked on the Romanian A2 motorway section between Cernavodă and Medgidia, between March 2009 and April 2011, when the contract was terminated by the National Company of Motorways and National Roads of Romania due to low progress from the French company.

Resident diplomatic missions
 France has an embassy in Bucharest.
 Romania has an embassy in Paris and a consulates-general in Lyon, Marseille and Strasbourg.

See also  
 Foreign relations of France
 Foreign relations of Romania
 Romanians in France
 French diaspora

References

Further reading
 Bowd, Gavin. "De Gaulle, Ceausescu and May 1968." Twentieth Century Communism 3.3 (2011): 131–147.
 Gatejel, Luminita. "A Socialist–Capitalist joint venture: Citroën in Romania during the 1980s." Journal of Transport History 38.1 (2017): 70–87.
 Hoisington Jr, William A. "The Struggle for Economic Influence in Southeastern Europe: The French Failure in Romania, 1940." Journal of Modern History 43.3 (1971): 468–482.  online
 Jackson, Peter. "France and the guarantee to Romania, April 1939." Intelligence and National Security 10.2 (1995): 242–272.
 Thomas, Martin. "To arm an ally: French arms sales to Romania, 1926–1940." Journal of Strategic Studies 19.2 (1996): 231–259.
 Torrey, Glenn E. Henri Mathias Berthelot: Soldier of France, Defender of Romania (Histria Books, 2001).

External links 
  French Foreign Ministry about relations with Romania 
  Romanian Foreign Ministry about relations with France
  French embassy in Bucharest (in French)
  Romanian embassy in Paris

 
Romania
Bilateral relations of Romania